The Central District of Qeshm County is a district (bakhsh) in Qeshm County, Hormozgan Province, Iran. At the 2006 census, its population was 68,070, in 15,180 families.  The District has two cities: Qeshm and Dargahan. The District has two rural districts (dehestan): Howmeh Rural District and Ramkan Rural District.

References 

Districts of Hormozgan Province
Qeshm County